The Drummondville Voltigeurs are a junior ice hockey team of the Quebec Major Junior Hockey League (QMJHL). The franchise was originally granted for the 1982–83 season, and is based in Drummondville, Quebec, Canada, playing its home games at the Centre Marcel Dionne. The team won the QMJHL's President's Cup in 2009.

History
Drummondville had a QMJHL team at the foundation of the League in 1969, called the Drummondville Rangers. However, the team folded at the end of the 1973–74 season. For the 1982–83 season, the city was granted an expansion franchise, along with the Longueuil Chevaliers. The team was named for a Quebec-based regiment that fought in the War of 1812, the Canadian Voltigeurs.

On February 9, 1989, Drummondville's coach and general manager Jean Bégin, was suspended indefinitely after he was arrested and charged with sexual assault.

The Voltigeurs have participated in the Memorial Cup tournament three times. In 1988 and 1991, they participated as the QMJHL runner-up and in 2009 as League champions. The Voltigeurs won both the President's Cup and Jean Rougeau Trophy during the 2008–09 season. In the 2009 Memorial Cup, the Voltigeurs finished second in the round robin, but lost to the Windsor Spitfires in the semi-finals.

Championships
Memorial Cup
1988 4th place (in Chicoutimi, Quebec)
1991 Finalists vs. Spokane Chiefs (in Quebec City, Quebec)
2009 Semi-Finalists vs. Windsor Spitfires (in Rimouski, Quebec)

President's Cup
1988 Finalists vs. Hull Olympiques (lost 4–3)
1991 Finalists vs. Chicoutimi Saguenéens (lost 4–0)
2009 Champions vs. Shawinigan Cataractes (won 4–3)

Jean Rougeau Trophy
2008–09 – 112 points

Notable coaches
 Jean Bégin
 Guy Boucher
 Frank Breault
 Jos Canale
 Dominique Ducharme
 Jocelyn Guevremont
 Jean Hamel
 Blair MacKasey
 Michel Parizeau
 Ron Ward

Players

NHL alumni

 Jake Allen
 Alex Barré-Boulet
 Derick Brassard
 Daniel Brière
 William Carrier
 Steve Chartrand
 Max Comtois
 René Corbet
 Sean Couturier
 Steve Duchesne
 Denis Gauthier
 Mike Hoffman
 Dmitri Kulikov
 Ian Laperrière
 Guillaume Latendresse
 Pierre-Olivier Joseph
 Ondřej Palát
 Joe Veleno

Retired numbers
7 - Sean Couturier
12 – Steve Chartrand
14 – Daniel Brière / Ian Laperrière
18 – Steve Duchesne
21 – Denis Gauthier
22 – Guillaume Latendresse
 25 – René Corbet
 61 – Derick Brassard

References

External links
Official Site
QMJHL Arena Guide profile

Ice hockey teams in Quebec
Quebec Major Junior Hockey League teams
Sport in Drummondville
1982 establishments in Quebec
Ice hockey clubs established in 1982